The cabinet of the state of Andhra Pradesh, India, forms the executive branch of the government of Andhra Pradesh.  The state cabinet of Andhra Pradesh was sworn in in September 2009. After the death of Sitting chief minister YS Rajasekhara reddy, Konijeti Rosaiah. Later, October, new ministers were indicted.

Council of Ministers

References

Andhra Pradesh ministries
Indian National Congress state ministries
2009 in Indian politics
Indian politicians
2009 establishments in Andhra Pradesh
Cabinets established in 2009
Cabinets disestablished in 2009
2009 disestablishments in India
Andhra Pradesh MLAs 2009–2014